A 26-part constitutional referendum was held in the Federated States of Micronesia on 2 July 1991. Only four of the proposals to amend the constitution were approved by voters.

Results

Passed amendments

References

1991 referendums
Referendums in the Federated States of Micronesia
1991 in the Federated States of Micronesia
Constitutional referendums